Sara Awad Issa Musallam is a businesswoman and politician from the United Arab Emirates. On 22 May 2022, she joined the Cabinet of the United Arab Emirates as Minister of State for Early Education with responsibility for the newly established Federal Authority for Early Education.

Education 
Musallam graduated from the American University of Sharjah and the Higher Colleges of Technology in Abu Dhabi.

Roles 
Musallam has held the following roles:

 Member of Abu Dhabi Executive Council
 Member of Life Quality and Wellbeing Committee of Abu Dhabi Executive Committee
 Board member of Al Yah Satellite Communication Company (YahSat)
 Member of UAE Cabinet's Education and Human Resources Council
 Member of the Board of Trustees of Khalifa Award for Education
 Member of the Board of Trustees of Abu Dhabi Early Childhood Authority
 Member of Abu Dhabi's Advanced Technology Research Council
 Member of the UAE's National Emergency, Crisis and Disasters Management Authority
 Member of the Board of Trustees of Mohamed bin Zayed University for Humanities
 Member of the Board of Trustees of MODON

References 

Living people
Year of birth missing (living people)
Place of birth missing (living people)
Education ministers of the United Arab Emirates
Women government ministers of the United Arab Emirates